Religious pluralism is an attitude or policy regarding the diversity of religious belief systems co-existing in society. It can indicate one or more of the following:

 Recognizing and tolerating the religious diversity of a society or country, promoting freedom of religion, and defining secularism as neutrality (of the state or non-sectarian institution) on issues of religion as opposed to opposition of religion in the public forum or public square that is open to public expression, and promoting friendly separation of religion and state as opposed to hostile separation or antitheism espoused by other forms of secularism. 
 Any of several forms of religious inclusivism. One such worldview holds that one's own religion is not the sole and exclusive source of truth, and thus acknowledges that at least some truths and true values exist in other religions. Another concept is that two or more religions with mutually exclusive truth claims are equally valid; this may be considered a form of either toleration (a concept that arose as a result of the European wars of religion) or moral relativism. Perennialism (based on the concept of philosophia perennis) or Traditionalism is the understanding that the exclusive claims of different religions turn out, upon closer examination, to be variations of universal truths that have been taught since time immemorial.
 Sometimes as a synonym for ecumenism, i.e., the promotion of some level of unity, co-operation, and improved understanding between different religions or different denominations within a single religion.
 As a term for the condition of harmonious co-existence between adherents of different religions or religious denominations.
As a social norm and not merely a synonym for religious diversity.

Definition and scopes

Religious pluralism, to paraphrase the title of a recent academic work, goes beyond mere toleration. Chris Beneke, in Beyond Toleration: The Religious Origins of American Pluralism, explains the difference between religious tolerance and religious pluralism by pointing to the situation in the late 18th century United States. By the 1730s, in most colonies religious minorities had obtained what contemporaries called religious toleration: "The policy of toleration relieved religious minorities of some physical punishments and some financial burdens, but it did not make them free from the indignities of prejudice and exclusion. Nor did it make them equal. Those 'tolerated' could still be barred from civil offices, military positions, and university posts."  In short, religious toleration is only the absence of religious persecution, and does not necessarily preclude religious discrimination. However, in the following decades something extraordinary happened in the Thirteen Colonies, at least if one views the events from "a late eighteenth-century perspective". Gradually the colonial governments expanded the policy of religious toleration, but then, between the 1760s and the 1780s, they replaced it with "something that is usually called religious liberty".  Mark Silka, in "Defining Religious Pluralism in America: A Regional Analysis", states that religious pluralism "enables a country made up of people of different faiths to exist without sectarian warfare or the persecution of religious minorities. Understood differently in different times and places, it is a cultural construct that embodies some shared conception of how a country's various religious communities relate to each other and to the larger nation whole."

Religious pluralism can be defined as "respecting the otherness of others". Freedom of religion encompasses all religions acting within the law in a particular region. Exclusivist religions teach that theirs is the only way to salvation and to religious truth, and some of them would even argue that it is necessary to suppress the falsehoods taught by other religions. Some Protestant sects argue fiercely against Roman Catholicism, and fundamentalist Christians of all kinds teach that religious practices like those of Paganism and witchcraft are pernicious. This was a common historical attitude prior to the Enlightenment, and has appeared as governmental policy into the present day under systems like Afghanistan's Taliban regime, which destroyed the ancient Buddhas of Bamyan. Of course, many religious communities have long been engaged in building peace, justice, and development themselves, and the emergence of the secular peacemaking field has led religious communities to systematize and institutionalize their own peacebuilding and interfaith work. The Catholic Church has worked in development and poverty reduction, human rights, solidarity, and peace, and after World War II, it began to develop specific tools and apply conflict transformation practices.

Giving one religion or denomination special rights that are denied to others can weaken religious pluralism. This situation was observed in Europe through the Lateran Treaty and Church of England. In modern era, many Islamic countries have laws that criminalize the act of leaving Islam to someone born in Muslim family, forbid entry to non-Muslims into Mosques, and forbid construction of Church, Synagogue or Temples inside their countries.

Relativism, the belief that all religions are equal in their value and that none of the religions give access to absolute truth, is an extreme form of inclusivism. Likewise, syncretism, the attempt to take over creeds of practices from other religions or even to blend practices or creeds from different religions into one new faith is an extreme form of inter-religious dialogue. Syncretism must not be confused with ecumenism, the attempt to bring closer and eventually reunite different denominations of one religion that have a common origin but were separated by a schism.

History

Cultural and religious pluralism has a long history and development that reaches from antiquity to contemporary trends in post-modernity.

German philosophers of religion Ludwig Feuerbach and Ernst Troeltsch concluded that Asian religious traditions, in particular Hinduism and Buddhism, were the earliest proponents of religious pluralism and granting of freedom to the individuals to choose their own faith and develop a personal religious construct within it (see also Relationship between Buddhism and Hinduism); Jainism, another ancient Indian religion, as well as Daoism have also always been inclusively flexible and have long favored religious pluralism for those who disagree with their religious viewpoints. The Age of Enlightenment in Europe triggered a sweeping transformation about religion after the French Revolution (liberalism, democracy, civil and political rights, freedom of thought, separation of Church and State, secularization), with rising acceptance of religious pluralism and decline of Christianity. According to Chad Meister, these pluralist trends in the Western thought, particularly since the 18th century, brought mainstream Christianity and Judaism closer to the Asian traditions of philosophical pluralism and religious tolerance.

Baháʼí Faith

Bahá'u'lláh, founder of Baháʼí Faith, a religion that developed in Persia, having roots in Islam, urged the elimination of religious intolerance. He taught that God is one, and religion has been progressively revealed over time through Manifestations of God, the founders of religion. Bahá'u'lláh taught that Baháʼís must associate with peoples of all religions, whether this is reciprocated or not.

Baháʼís refer to this concept as Progressive revelation, meaning that each religion brings a more advanced understanding of divinity and updated social laws as mankind matures. In this view, God's word is revealed through a series of messengers: Abraham, Krishna, Moses, Buddha, Jesus, Muhammad, Báb and Bahá'u'lláh (the founder of the Baháʼí Faith) among them. According to Baháʼí writings, there will not be another messenger for many hundreds of years. .
There is also a respect for the religious traditions of the native peoples of the planet who may have little other than oral traditions as a record of their religious figures.

Buddhism

Buddhist doctrine, fundamentally based upon minimizing or negating the suffering which arises from attachment, like its sister Indic religions, opposes exclusivism and emphasizes pluralism. This is not only encapsulated in the life story of the Buddha, who sought many gurus himself before resolving to seek Enlightenment on his own, but also in Buddhist scripture.

The Buddha also himself stated that truth is compromised when an individual is not open to entertaining a wide array of teachings. Moreover, without a pluralist understanding, the Buddha stated that truth cannot be discovered or ascertained such that it is truly known:

In the Lankavatara Sutra, the Buddha gave a long treatise on the idea that various expressions of Truth may seem contradictory or boundless, yet they all speak of Truth itself - emphasizing that an Enlightened One both accepts pluralism in that there are many ways to referring to Truth, but rises above it through the understanding that Truth transcends all labels.

When asked, "Don't all religions teach the same thing? Is it possible to unify them?" the Dalai Lama said:

Classical civilization: Greek and Roman religions

For the Romans, religion was part of the daily life. Each home had a household shrine at which prayers and libations to the family's domestic deities were offered. Neighborhood shrines and sacred places such as springs and groves dotted the city. The Roman calendar was structured around religious observances; in the Imperial Era, as many as 135 days of the year were devoted to religious festivals and games (ludi). Women, slaves and children all participated in a range of religious activities. Some public rituals could be conducted only by women, and women formed what is perhaps Rome's most famous priesthood, the state-supported Vestal Virgins, who tended Rome's sacred hearth for centuries, until disbanded under Christian persecution and domination.

The Romans are known for the great number of deities they honored. The presence of Greeks on the Italian peninsula from the beginning of the historical period influenced Roman culture, introducing some religious practices that became as fundamental as the cult of Apollo. The Romans looked for common ground between their major gods and those of the Greeks, adapting Greek myths and iconography for Latin literature and Roman art. Etruscan religion was also a major influence, particularly on the practice of augury, since Rome had once been ruled by Etruscan kings.

Mystery religions imported from the Near East (Ptolemaic Egypt, Persia and Mesopotamia), which offered initiates salvation through a personal God and eternal life after the death, were a matter of personal choice for an individual, practiced in addition to carrying on one's family rites and participating in public religion. The mysteries, however, involved exclusive oaths and secrecy, conditions that conservative Romans viewed with suspicion as characteristic of "magic", conspiracy (coniuratio), and subversive activity. Sporadic and sometimes brutal attempts were made to suppress religionists who seemed to threaten traditional Roman morality and unity, as with the Senate's efforts to restrict the Bacchanals in 186 BC.

As the Romans extended their dominance throughout the Mediterranean world, their policy in general was to absorb the deities and cults of other peoples rather than try to eradicate them, since they believed that preserving tradition promoted social stability.

One way that Rome incorporated diverse peoples was by supporting their religious heritage, building temples to local deities that framed their theology within the hierarchy of Roman religion. Inscriptions throughout the Empire record the side-by-side worship of local and Roman deities, including dedications made by Romans to local Gods. By the height of the Empire, numerous international deities were cultivated at Rome and had been carried to even the most remote provinces (among them Cybele, Isis, Osiris, Serapis, Epona), and Gods of solar monism such as Mithras and Sol Invictus, found as far north as Roman Britain. Because Romans had never been obligated to cultivate one deity or one cult only, religious tolerance was not an issue in the sense that it is for competing monotheistic religions. The monotheistic rigor of Judaism posed difficulties for Roman policy that led at times to compromise and the granting of special exemptions, but sometimes to intractable conflict.

Christianity

Some Christians have argued that religious pluralism is an invalid or self-contradictory concept.

Maximal forms of religious pluralism claim that all religions are equally true, or that one religion can be true for some and another for others. Most Christians hold this idea to be logically impossible from the principle of contradiction. The two largest Christian branches, the Catholic Church and the Eastern Orthodox Church, both claim to be the "one true church" and that "outside the true Church there is no salvation"; Protestantism however, which has many different denominations, has no consistent doctrine in this regard, and has a variety of different positions regarding religious pluralism.

Other Christians have held that there can be truth value and salvific value in other faith traditions. John Macquarrie, described in the Handbook of Anglican Theologians (1998) as "unquestionably Anglicanism's most distinguished systematic theologian in the second half of the twentieth century", wrote that "there should be an end to proselytizing but that equally there should be no syncretism of the kind typified by the Baháʼí movement" (p. 2). In discussing 9 founders of major faith traditions (Moses, Zoroaster, Lao-zu, Buddha, Confucius, Socrates, Krishna, Jesus, and Muhammad), which he called "mediators between the human and the divine", Macquarrie wrote that:

The Church of Jesus Christ of Latter-day Saints also teaches a form of religious pluralism, that there is at least some truth in almost all religions and philosophies.

Classical Christian views
Before the Great Schism, mainstream Christianity confessed "one holy catholic and apostolic church", in the words of the Nicene Creed. Roman Catholics, Orthodox Christians, Episcopalians and most Protestant Christian denominations still maintain this belief. Furthermore, the Catholic Church makes the claim that it alone is the one and only true Church founded by Jesus Christ, but the Eastern Orthodox and Oriental Orthodox Churches also make this claim in respect to themselves.

Church unity for these groups, as in the past, is something very visible and tangible, and schism was just as serious an offense as heresy. Following the Great Schism, Roman Catholicism sees and recognizes the Orthodox Sacraments as valid but illicit and without canonical jurisdiction. Eastern Orthodoxy does not have the concept of "validity" when applied to Sacraments, but it considers the form of Roman Catholic Sacraments to be acceptable, and there is some recognition of Catholic sacraments among some, but not all, Orthodox. Both generally mutually regard each other as "heterodox" and "schismatic", while continuing to recognize each other as Christian, at least secundum quid (see ecumenicism).

Modern Christian views
Some other Protestants hold that only believers who believe in certain fundamental doctrines know the true pathway to salvation. The core of this doctrine is that Jesus Christ was a perfect man, is the Son of God and that he died and rose again for the wrongdoing of those who will accept the gift of salvation.  They continue to believe in "one" church, an "invisible church" which encompasses different types of Christians in different sects and denominations, believing in certain issues they deem fundamental, while disunited on a variety of doctrines they deem non-fundamental. Some evangelical Protestants are doubtful if Roman Catholics or Eastern Orthodox can possibly be members of this "invisible church", and usually they reject religious (typically restorationist) movements rooted in 19th century American Christianity, such as Mormonism, Christian Science, or Jehovah's Witnesses as not distinctly Christian.

The Catholic Church, unlike some Protestant denominations, affirms "developmental theology," understood to mean that the "Holy Spirit, in and through the evolving and often confused circumstances of concrete history, is gradually bringing the Church to an ever more mature understanding of the deposit of faith (the saving truths entrusted by Jesus Christ to the Apostles—these as such cannot be changed or added to). The Church comes to recognize baptism of desire quite early in its history. Later, the Church realizes that Romans 2:14–16, for example, allows for the salvation of non-Christians who do not have unobstructed exposure to Christian teachings: "When Gentiles who have not the law do by nature what the law requires…  They show that what the law requires is written on their hearts… Various forms of "implicit faith" come to hold standing, until at Vatican Council II, the Church declares: "Nor shall divine providence deny the assistance necessary for salvation to those who, without any fault of theirs, have not yet arrived at an explicit knowledge of God, and who, not without grace, strive to lead a good life" (#16). Vatican Council II in its Declaration Nostra aetate addresses the non-Christian religions with respect and appreciation, affirming the goodness found in them. Since Vatican Council II, Catholic dialogists in particular are working out the implications of John Paul II's statement, in Redemptor hominis #6 that Christians should recognize "the Holy Spirit operating outside the visible confines of the Mystical Body of Christ." Among these dialogists, Robert Magliola, an affiliate of the Italian community "Vangelo e Zen" ("The Gospel and Zen"), Desio and Milano, Italy, who taught in predominantly Buddhist cultures for years, and practiced Buddhist-Catholic dialogue there and in the West, and who is widely published in this dialogue, argues the following:

Hinduism

Hinduism is naturally pluralistic as it "acknowledges different forms and representations of the divine, all understood in their relation to the supreme being, Brahman." Historians argue that the differentiations between the various Indic religions of the subcontinent were blurred before their specific codification and separation during British efforts to catalog different Indic philosophies.  . Moreover, Hinduism itself is the oldest major religion, explaining a relative lack of antipathy towards specifiable religious traditions - and so the Hindu religion has no theological difficulties in accepting degrees of truth in other religions. . From a Vedantic perspective, Swami Bhaskarananda argues that Hinduism emphasizes that everyone actually worships the same God, whether one knows it or not. In the 8th sutra of the Pratyabhijñahrdyam, the Indian philosopher Ksemaraja says that all the siddhantas or theses of all the darsanas (schools of thought) are just the different aspects of the one Atman. It being all-pervading and all-inclusive, from matter to consciousness to nothingness, all are its aspects or its different roles. The Advaita Vedanta philosophy, a widely held view of many Hindus who follow Sanatana Dharma, encompasses pluralism.. Other, lesser-known philosophers have strived to encompass Indic philosophies under traditions other than Advaita, including the Indian philosopher Vijñabhikshu. Thus, the culture of open boundaries and continuous interaction and synthesis between all schools of thought is a very important aspect in understanding Hinduism and its fundamental nature of plurality.

In several mantras, sutras, smriti, and shruti, the idea that there are many ways to approach Truth or an underlying Reality is emphasized.

For example, the Rig Veda states that the Truth can be known in different ways:

The Rig Veda also envisions an ideal world where a diverse collective speaks together to focus upon an idea that pervades all:

The Uddhava Gita is explicit that those interested in spirituality should learn the perspectives of a diverse group of proficient practitioners rather than a singular one who espouses a specific doctrine:

Conversely, the Bhagavad Gita warns against exclusivism:

It also affirms Truth in a variety of spiritual practices:

Islam 

The primary sources that guide Islam, namely Quran and Sunnahs, may be interpreted as promoting the fundamental right to practice an individual's belief. However, the acceptability of religious pluralism within Islam remains a topic of active debate, though the vast majority of Islamic scholars and historical evidences reveal Islam's commitment to no coercion in religion, supporting pluralism in the context of relative toleration. Hamed Kazemzadeh, a pluralist orientalist argues that cultural absolutism of ours is, of course, today under heavy pressure, a double pressure of defining and semi-bankrupt imperialism and surprisingly strong counter assertive challenge that changed the mentality of Muslims to have a pluralist identity. Then he highlights the policy method of Islam Messenger in the early Islamic civilization toward other religions.

In several Surah, Quran asks Muslims to remain steadfast with Islam, and not yield to the vain desires of other religions and unbelievers. These verses have been interpreted to imply pluralism in religions. For example, Surah Al-Ma'idah verses 47 through 49 state:

Surah Al-Ankabut verse 45 through 47 state:

Surah Al-E-Imran verses 62 through 66 state:

Surah Al-Kafiroon verse 1 through 6 state:

Several verses of the Quran  state that Islam rejects religious pluralism. For example, Surah Al-Tawba verse 1 through 5 seems to command the Muslim to slay the pagans (with verse 9.5 called the 'sword verse'): 

However, this verse has been explained.

Bernard Lewis presents some of his conclusions about Islamic culture, Sharia law, jihad, and the modern day phenomenon of terrorism in his text, Islam: The Religion and the People. He writes of jihad as a distinct "religious obligation", but suggests that "it is a pity" that people engaging in terrorist activities are not more aware of their own religion:

In Surah Al-Tawba, verse 29 demands Muslims to fight all those who do not believe in Islam, including Christians and Jews (People of the Book), until they pay the Jizya, a tax, with willing submission.

Some people have concluded from verse 9:29, that Muslims are commanded to attack all non-Muslims until they pay money, but Shaykh Jalal Abualrub writes:

In Surah Al-Nisa, verse 89 has been misquoted to seem that it says to slay the apostates. In actuality, it only commands Muslims to fight those who practice oppression or persecution, or attack the Muslims.

Sufism
The Sufis were practitioners of the esoteric mystic traditions within an Islam at a certain point. Sufism is defined by the Sufi master or Pir (Sufism) or fakeer or Wali in the language of the people by dancing and singing and incorporating various philosophies, theologies, ideologies and religions together (e.g., Christianity, Judaism, Paganism, Platonism, Zoroastrianism, Buddhism, Hinduism, Sikhism and so forth with time). Famous Sufi masters are Rumi, Shadhili, Sheikh Farid, Bulleh Shah, Shah Hussain, Shams Tabrizi, Waris Shah, al-Ghazali, Mian Mir, Attar of Nishapur, Amir Khusrow, Salim Chishti. See many more famous Sufis at the List of Sufis. The Sufis were considered by many to have divine revelations with messages of peace, tolerance, equality, pluralism, love for all and hate for no one, humanitarians, philosophers, psychologists and much more. Many had the teaching if you want to change the world, change yourself and you will change the whole world. The views of the Sufi poets, philosophers and theologians have inspired multiple forms of modern-day academia as well as philosophers of other religions. See also Blind men and an elephant. But undoubtedly, the most influential Sufi scholar to have embraced the world is Jalaluddin Muhammad Rumi. He was born in 1207 AD in a northern province of Afghanistan, however, he later had to seek refuge in Turkey following the invasion of Afghanistan by Mongols. Rumi, through his poetry and teachings, propagated inter-faith harmony like none other.  He served as a uniting figure for people of different faiths and his followers included Muslims, Christians and Jews. Even today, Rumi's popularity does not cease to exist within the Sufi Muslim community and his message of peace and harmony transcends religious and geographical boundaries.

Rumi says:
I looked for God. I went to a temple, and I didn't find him there. Then I went to a church, and I didn't find him there. And then I went to a mosque, and I didn't find him there. And then finally I looked in my heart, and there he was. 

Rumi also says:
How many paths are there to God? There are as many paths to God as there are souls on the Earth.

Rumi also says:
 A true Lover doesn't follow any one religion,
be sure of that.
Since in the religion of Love,
there is no irreverence or faith.
When in Love,
body, mind, heart and soul don't even exist.
Become this,
fall in Love,
and you will not be separated again.

Ahmadiyya

Ahmadis recognize many founders of world religions to be from God, who all brought teaching and guidance from God to all peoples. According to the Ahmadiyya understanding of the Quran, every nation in the history of mankind has been sent a prophet, as the Quran states: And there is a guide for every people. Though the Quran mentions only 24 prophets, the founder of Islam, Muhammad states that the world has seen 124,000 prophets. Thus other than the prophets mentioned in the Quran, Ahmadis, with support from theological study also recognize Buddha, Krishna, founders of Chinese religions to be divinely appointed individuals.

The Second Khalifatul Maish of the Ahmadiyya Muslim Community writes:
"According to this teaching there has not been a single people at any time in history or anywhere in the world who have not had a warner from God, a teacher, a prophet. According to the Quran there have been prophets at all times and in all countries. India, China, Russia, Afghanistan, parts of Africa, Europe, America—all had prophets according to the theory of divine guidance taught by the Quran. When, therefore, Muslims hear about prophets of other peoples or other countries, they do not deny them. They do not brand them as liars. Muslims believe that other peoples have had their teachers. If other peoples have had prophets, books, and laws, these constitute no difficulty for Islam."

Mirza Ghulam Ahmad, founder of the Ahmadiyya Muslim Community wrote in his book A Message of Peace:
"Our God has never discriminated between one people and another. This is illustrated by the fact that all the potentials and capabilities (Prophets) which have been granted to the Aryans (Hindus) have also been granted to the races inhabiting Arabia, Persia, Syria, China, Japan, Europe and America."

In modern practice
Religious pluralism is a contested issue in modern Islamic countries. Twenty three (23) Islamic countries have laws, as of 2014, which make it a crime, punishable with death penalty or prison, for a Muslim, by birth or conversion, to leave Islam or convert to another religion. In Muslim countries such as Algeria, it is illegal to preach, persuade or attempt to convert a Muslim to another religion. Saudi Arabia and several Islamic nations have strict laws against the construction of Christian churches, Jewish synagogues, Hindu temples and Buddhist stupas anywhere inside the country, by anyone including minorities working there. Brunei in southeast Asia adopted Sharia law in 2013 that prescribes a death penalty for any Muslim who converts from Islam to another religion. Other Islamic scholars state Sharia does not allow non-Muslim minorities to enjoy religious freedoms in a Muslim-majority nation, but other scholars disagree.

Jainism

Anekāntavāda, the principle of relative pluralism, is one of the basic principles of Jainism. In this view, the truth or the reality is perceived differently from different points of view, and no single point of view is the complete truth. Jain doctrine states that an object has infinite modes of existence and qualities and they cannot be completely perceived in all its aspects and manifestations, due to inherent limitations of the humans. Only the Kevalins—the omniscient beings—can comprehend the object in all its aspects and manifestations, and all others are capable of knowing only a part of it. Consequently, no one view can claim to represent the absolute truth—only relative truths. Jains compare all attempts to proclaim absolute truth with   andhgajnyaya  or the "maxim of the blind men and elephant", wherein all the blind men claimed to explain the true appearance of the elephant, but could only partly succeed due to their narrow perspective. For Jains, the problem with the blind men is not that they claim to explain the true appearance of the elephant; the problem is doing so to the exclusion of all other claims. Since absolute truth is many-sided, embracing any truth to the exclusion of others is to commit the error of ekānta (one-sidedness). Openness to the truths of others is one way in which Jainism embodies religious pluralism.

Sikhism

The Sikh gurus have propagated the message of "many paths" leading to the one God and ultimate salvation for all souls who treading on the path of righteousness. They have supported the view that proponents of all faiths, by doing good and virtuous deeds and by remembering the Lord, can certainly achieve salvation. Sikhs are told to accept all leading faiths as possible vehicles for attaining spiritual enlightenment, provided the faithful study, ponder and practice the teachings of their prophets and leaders. Sikhism had many interactions with Sufism as well as Hinduism, influenced them and was influenced by them.

The Sri Guru Granth Sahib, the holy book of the Sikhs, says:

As well as:
Some call the Lord "Ram, Ram", and some "Khuda". Some serve Him as "Gusain", others as "Allah". He is the Cause of causes, and Generous. He showers His Grace and Mercy upon us. Some pilgrims bathe at sacred shrines, others go on Hajj to Mecca. Some do devotional worship, whilst others bow their heads in prayer.  Some read the Vedas, and some the Koran.  Some wear blue robes, and some wear white.  Some call themselves Muslim, and some call themselves Hindu. Some yearn for paradise, and others long for heaven. Says Nanak, one who realizes the Hukam of God's Will, knows the secrets of his Lord Master. (Sri Guru Granth Sahib Page:885) 

One who recognizes that all spiritual paths lead to the One shall be emancipated. One who speaks lies shall fall into hell and burn. In all the world, the most blessed and sanctified are those who remain absorbed in Truth. (SGGS Ang 142) 

The seconds, minutes, and hours, days, weeks and months and various seasons originate from One Sun; O nanak, in just the same way, the many forms originate from the Creator. (Guru Granth Sahib page 12,13)

The Guru Granth Sahib also says that Bhagat Namdev and Bhagat Kabir, who were both believed to be Hindus, both attained salvation though they were born before Sikhism took root and were clearly not Sikhs. This highlights and reinforces the Guru's saying that "peoples of other faiths" can join with God as true and also at the same time signify that Sikhism is not the exclusive path for liberation.

Additionally the Guru Granth Sahib says:
First, Allah (God) created the Light; then, by His Creative Power, He made all mortal beings. From the One Light, the entire universe welled up. So who is good, and who is bad? ||1|| 

Again, the Guru Granth Sahib Ji provides this verse:
Naam Dayv the printer, and Kabeer the weaver, obtained salvation through the Perfect Guru. Those who know God and recognize His Shabad ("word") lose their ego and class consciousness. (Guru Granth Sahib page 67) 

Most of the 15 Sikh Bhagats who are mentioned in their holy book were non-Sikhs and belonged to Hindu and Muslim faiths, which were the most prevalent religions of this region.

The pluralistic dialogue of Sikhism began with the founder of Sikhism Guru Nanak after becoming enlightened saying the words Na koi hindu na koi musalman - "There is no Hindu, there is no Muslim". He recognised that religious labels held no value and it is the deeds of human that will be judged in the hereafter what we call ourselves religiously holds no value.

Sikhs have been considered eager exponents of interfaith dialogue and not only accept the right of others to practice their faith but have in the past fought and laid down their lives to protect this right for others; the Martyrdom of Guru Tegh Bahadar, who on the pleas of a pandit of the Kashmiris, agreed to fight against a tyrannic Moghul Empire (that was forcing them to convert to Islam) in order that they might gain the freedom to practice their religion, which differed from his own.

Religious pluralism and human service professions
The concept of religious pluralism is also relevant to human service professions, such as psychology and social work, as well as medicine and nursing, in which trained professionals may interact with clients from diverse faith traditions. For example, psychologist Kenneth Pargament has described four possible stances toward client religious and spiritual beliefs, which he called rejectionist, exclusivist, constructivist, and pluralist. Unlike the constructivist stance, the pluralist stance:

Importantly, "the pluralistic therapist can hold personal religious beliefs while appreciating those of a client with different religious beliefs. The pluralist recognizes that religious value differences can and will exist between counselors and clients without adversely affecting therapy" (p. 168). The stances implied by these four helping orientations on several key issues, such as "should religious issues be discussed in counseling?", have also been presented in tabular form (p. 362, Table 12.1).

The profession of chaplaincy, a religious profession, must also deal with issues of pluralism and the relevance of a pluralistic stance. For example, Friberg argues: "With growing populations of immigrants and adherents of religions not previously seen in significant numbers in North America, spiritual care must take religion and diversity seriously. Utmost respect for the residents' spiritual and religious histories and orientations is imperative" (p. 182).

Skepticism

Argument from inconsistent revelations
The argument from inconsistent revelations is an argument that aims to show that one cannot choose one religion over another since their revelations are inconsistent with each other and that any two religions cannot be true. The argument appears, among other places, in Voltaire's Candide and Philosophical Dictionary. It is also manifested in Denis Diderot's statement in response to Pascal's Wager that, whatever proofs are offered for the existence of God in Christianity or any other religion, "an Imam can reason the same way". Also in response to Pascal's Wager, J. L. Mackie said "the church within which alone salvation is to be found is not necessarily the Church of Rome, but perhaps that of the Anabaptists or the Mormons or the Muslim Sunnis or the worshippers of Kali or of Odin".

See also

References

Works cited
 .
 Ashk Dahlén, 2006, Sirat al-mustaqim: One or Many? Religious Pluralism Among Muslim Intellectuals in Iran in The Blackwell Companion to Contemporary Islamic Thought, ed. Ibrahim Abu-Rabi, Oxford.
 Eck, Diane (2001) A New Religious America: How a "Christian Country" Has Become the World's Most Religiously Diverse Nation, San Francisco: Harper.
 Robert Gordis, 1962, Ground Rules for a Christian-Jewish Dialogue in The Root and the Branch, Univ. of Chicago Press.
 Robert Gordis et al., 1988, Emet Ve-Emunah: Statement of Principles of Conservative Judaism, Jewish Theological Seminary and the Rabbinical Assembly.
 Kenneth Einar Himma (August 2002), "Finding a High Road: The Moral Case for Salvific Pluralism," International Journal for Philosophy of Religion, vol. 52, no. 1, 1–33.
 Hutchison, William R. (2003) Religious Pluralism in America: The Contentious History of a Founding Ideal, New Haven: Yale University Press.
 Kalmin, Richard (1994), Christians and Heretics in Rabbinic Literature of Late Antiquity,  Harvard Theological Review, Volume 87(2), pp. 155–69.
 
 Leon Klenicki ed., 1991, Toward a Theological Encounter: Jewish Understandings of Christiantiy, Paulist Press / Stimulus.
 Monecal, Maria Rosa (2002),The Ornament of the World: How Muslims, Jews, and Christians Created a Culture of Tolerance in Medieval Spain, Boston: Little, Brown, & Co.
 
 Hans Ucko ed., 1996, People of God, Peoples of God, WCC Publications.
 .

Further reading
 Abdelmassieh, Francis (2020). Egyptian-Islamic Views on the Comparison of Religions: Positions of Al-Azhar University Scholars on Muslim-Christian Relations. Münster: LIT. 

Albanese, Catherine, America: Religions and Religion. Belmont: WADSWORTH PUBLISHING, 1998, 
 Wrogemann, Henning (2019). A Theology of Interreligious Relations. Downer's Grove, Illinois: Intervarsity Press.

External links

 
 Global Centre for Pluralism
 Council on Foreign Relations Religion and Foreign Policy Initiative
 The Pluralism Project: Researching Religious Diversity in the United States
 A New Religious America: Managing Religious Diversity in a Democracy: Challenges and Prospects for the 21st Century  by Diana Eck, retrieved 2009-07-16.
 The Journal of Inter-Religious Dialogue
 Elijah Interfaith Institute: Inter Religious Dialogue

Buddhism
 Standing Up for the Middle Way: A Buddhist Perspective on Religious Freedom

Christianity
 Nostra Aetate: Declaration on the Relation of the Catholic Church to Non-Christian Religions
 World Council of Churches Bibliography of Works on Religious Pluralism

Hinduism
 Big Picture TV  Video of Ela Gandhi, granddaughter of Mahatma Gandhi, talking about religious pluralism

Islam
 Islam and Religious Pluralism by Ayatullah Murtadha Mutahhari
 Spiritual Education Lesson Plans for Children

Judaism
 The imperative of Religious Pluralism: A Conservative Jewish View
 Darbu Emet: A Jewish Statement About Christianity